I Know What Love Isn't is the third studio album by Swedish indie pop musician Jens Lekman. The album was released in Europe on September 3, 2012 by Service and in the United States on September 4, 2012 by Secretly Canadian.

"Erica America" was released as the album's lead single on June 25, 2012, followed by "I Know What Love Isn't" on August 10. I Know What Love Isn't was the final album released by Service, who had been Lekman's European label since 2004.

Critical reception

I Know What Love Isn't received positive reviews from most music critics. At Metacritic, which assigns a normalized rating out of 100 to reviews from mainstream critics, the album received an average score of 76, based on 28 reviews, which indicates "generally favorable reviews".

Track listing

Personnel
Credits for I Know What Love Isn't adapted from liner notes.

Jens Lekman – vocals, bass, beatboxing, guitar, harp, piano, writing, production, recording
Additional personnel

Andreas Andersson – flute
Sophia Brous – harmony vocals
Gus Franklin – harmony vocals
Paul Gold – mastering
Lars-Erik Grimelund – drums
Charlie Hall – drums
Marla Hansen – violin
Tim Harvey – harmony vocals
Emelie Jonazon – saxophone
Kristin Lidell – photography
Brian McTear – recording (drums)
Ulrika Mild – harmony vocals

Claudius Mittendorfer – mixing
Daniel Murphy – layout
Jonas Odhner – recording (bass and drums)
Gary Olson – recording (drums)
Matt Pence – mixing
Addison Rogers – harmony vocals
Lewis Rogers – harmony vocals
Julia Rydholm – bass
Hilda Stammarnäs – background vocals
Kellie Sutherland – harmony vocals
Niclas Svensson – bass
Frida Thurfjell – recorder, saxophone

Charts

References

2012 albums
Jens Lekman albums
Secretly Canadian albums
Service (record label) albums